Aske Emil Berg Adelgaard (born 10 November 2003) is a Danish professional footballer who plays as a left-back for Danish Superliga club OB.

Career

OB
Adelgaard is a product of OB, where he began his career. In the summer 2019, Adelgaard moved to Randers FC, before returning to OB in January 2021 - one and a half year - and signing a  deal until June 2023. 

Over the summer, Aske took part in several first team training sessions during the start of the season, and he also got a starting place in a training match against FC Midtjylland in May. On 31 July 2022 OB confirmed, that 18-year old Adelgaard had signed a five-year contract with the club and had been permanently promoted to the first team squad. Adelgaard got his official debut a week later, on 7 August 2022, against AGF.

References

External links

2003 births
Living people
Danish men's footballers
Association football defenders
Sportspeople from Odense
Danish Superliga players
Odense Boldklub players
Randers FC players